Sherwin Gardner (Arima) is a Trinidadian gospel reggae singer. He is noted for his use of dancehall style and patois.

Discography
Power In The Name 1998
100% Sold Out 1999
Revelation Unfold 2000
I Rather Jesus 2001
Leaning 2002
Closer 2003
Who I Am 2004
Elevation 2007
Borderless 2010
Relentless 2011
Nascent 2013
Veinticinco 2014
Fixer 2015

References

Living people
21st-century Trinidad and Tobago male singers
21st-century Trinidad and Tobago singers
Caribbean gospel singers
Reggae singers
20th-century Trinidad and Tobago male singers
20th-century Trinidad and Tobago singers
People from Arima
Year of birth missing (living people)